Randy Wayne Rich (born December 28, 1953) is a former American football defensive back who played three seasons in the National Football League with the Detroit Lions, Denver Broncos, Oakland Raiders and Cleveland Browns. He played college football at the University of New Mexico and attended North High School in Bakersfield, California. He is currently the Vice President of Ministry Relations for the Educational Media Foundation.

References

External links
Bob Elias Hall of Fame
New Mexico Lobos profile

Living people
1953 births
Players of American football from Bakersfield, California
American football defensive backs
New Mexico Lobos football players
Detroit Lions players
Denver Broncos players
Oakland Raiders players
Cleveland Browns players